The 2018 Algerian Super Cup was the  12th edition of the Algerian Super Cup, a football match contested by the winners of the 2017–18 Algerian Ligue Professionnelle 1 and 2017–18 Algerian Cup competitions. It is known as the Mobilis Supercoupe d'Algérie 2018 due to the start of a sponsorship deal with Mobilis ATM The match was played on November 1, 2018 at Mustapha Tchaker Stadium in Blida. between 2017-18 Ligue 1 winners CS Constantine and 2017–18 Algerian Cup winners USM Bel Abbès.

Match

Pre-match

Summary

Match details

See also
 2017–18 Algerian Ligue Professionnelle 1
 2017–18 Algerian Cup

Notes

References 

2018
Supercup